The Noida Sector 18  is a metro station on the Blue Line of the Delhi Metro. The central hub for shopping destinations in Noida including The Great India Place, DLF Mall of India. Atta Market(street shopping hub of Noida) among others is located just off the metro station.

Station layout

Market place
there is a sector 18 market below the metro station which consists of food places, street food, clothing, electronics, etc. opposite sector 18 market is a wholesale market also called atta market.

Facilities

List of available ATMs at Noida Sector 18 metro station are HDFC Bank and Punjab National Bank.

Connections

Bus
Delhi Transport Corporation bus routes number 33, 33A, 33EXT, 34A, 319, 319A, 323, 347, 443, 491 and 493 serve the station from the Sector 28 bus stop nearby.

In addition, the Yamuna Expressway Industrial Development Authority (YEIDA) runs the "Yamuna Sarthi" bus service connecting Noida, Greater Noida and the Yamuna Expressway Industrial Development Authority (YEIDA) areas. It consists of CNG semi-low-floor buses, each with a capacity of 50 passengers, running from the Botanical Garden metro station to Sector 22D in YEIDA area. The buses traverse a circular route covering 13 bus stops, including Botanical Garden metro station, The Great India Place Mall, Amity University, ATS Village in Sector 93A, KPMG, Kondli, Pari Chowk, Parasvnath P3, YEIDA office, Gautam Buddha University, Galgotia University, Dankaur and Sector 22D of the YEIDA area.

There are also some private Force Traveller operators that ply between the Botanical Garden metro station and Pari Chowk, Greater Noida, passing near the Sector-18 station.

See also
List of Delhi Metro stations
Transport in Delhi
Delhi Metro Rail Corporation
Delhi Suburban Railway
List of rapid transit systems in India

References

External links
 Delhi Metro Rail Corporation Ltd. (Official site)
 Delhi Metro Annual Reports
 
 UrbanRail.Net – descriptions of all metro systems in the world, each with a schematic map showing all stations.

Delhi Metro stations
Railway stations opened in 2009
Railway stations in Gautam Buddh Nagar district
Transport in Noida